Double click may refer to:
 Double-click, the act of pressing a computer mouse twice quickly without moving it
 DoubleClick, a subsidiary of Google that develops and provides Internet ad serving services
 Doubleclick (musician), a UK musician
 The Doubleclicks, and American musical duo